In Greek mythology, the Minotaur (in Latin as Minotaurus ) is a mythical creature portrayed during classical antiquity with the head and tail of a bull and the body of a man or, as described by Roman poet Ovid, a being "part man and part bull".
He dwelt at the center of the Labyrinth, which was an elaborate maze-like construction
designed by the architect Daedalus and his son Icarus, on the command of King Minos of Crete.  The Minotaur was eventually killed by the Athenian hero Theseus.

Etymology
The word minotaur derives from the Ancient Greek , a compound of the name  (Minos) and the noun  "bull", translated as "(the) Bull of Minos". In Crete, the Minotaur was known by the name Asterion, a name shared with Minos' foster-father.

"Minotaur" was originally a proper noun in reference to this mythical figure. That is, there was only the one Minotaur. In contrast, the use of "minotaur" as a common noun to refer to members of a generic "species" of bull-headed creatures developed much later, in 20th century fantasy genre fiction.

The Minotaur was called Θevrumineš in Etruscan.

English pronunciation of the word "Minotaur" is varied.

Creation and appearance

After ascending the throne of the island of Crete, Minos competed with his brothers as ruler. Minos prayed to the sea god Poseidon to send him a snow-white bull as a sign of the god's favour. Minos was to sacrifice the bull to honor Poseidon, but owing to the bull's beauty he decided instead to keep him. Minos believed that the god would accept a substitute sacrifice. To punish Minos, Poseidon made Minos' wife Pasiphaë fall in love with the bull. Pasiphaë had the craftsman Daedalus fashion a hollow wooden cow, which she climbed into to mate with the bull. The monstrous Minotaur was the result. Pasiphaë nursed the Minotaur but he grew in size and became ferocious. As the unnatural offspring of a woman and a beast, the Minotaur had no natural source of nourishment and thus devoured humans for sustenance. Minos, following advice from the oracle at Delphi, had Daedalus construct a gigantic Labyrinth to hold the Minotaur. Its location was near Minos's palace in Knossos.

The Minotaur is commonly represented in Classical art with the body of a man and the head and tail of a bull. According to Sophocles's Trachiniai, when the river spirit Achelous seduced Deianira, one of the guises he assumed was a man with the head of a bull. From classical antiquity through the Renaissance, the Minotaur appears at the center of many depictions of the Labyrinth. Ovid's Latin account of the Minotaur, which did not describe which half was bull and which half-man, was the most widely available during the Middle Ages, and several later versions show a man's head and torso on a bull's body – the reverse of the Classical configuration, reminiscent of a centaur. This alternative tradition survived into the Renaissance, and is reflected in Dryden's elaborated translation of Virgil's description of the Minotaur in Book VI of the Aeneid: "The lower part a beast, a man above / The monument of their polluted love."  It still figures in some modern depictions, such as Steele Savage's illustrations for Edith Hamilton's Mythology (1942).

Theseus myth 

All the stories agree that prince Androgeus, son of King Minos, died and that the fault lay with the Athenians. The sacrifice of young Athenian men and women was a penalty for his death.

In some versions he was killed by the Athenians because of their jealousy of the victories he had won at the Panathenaic Games; in others he was killed at Marathon by the Cretan Bull, his mother's former taurine lover, because Aegeus, king of Athens, had commanded Androgeus to slay it. The common tradition holds that Minos waged a war of revenge for the death of his son, and won. The consequence of Athens losing the war was the regular sacrifice of several of their youths and maidens.
In his account of the Minotaur's birth, Catullus refers to yet another version in which Athens was "compelled by the cruel plague to pay penalties for the killing of Androgeon". To avert a plague caused by divine retribution for the Cretan prince's death, Aegeus had to send into the Labyrinth "young men at the same time as the best of unwed girls as a feast" for the Minotaur.
Some accounts declare that Minos required seven Athenian youths and seven maidens, chosen by lots, to be sent every seventh year (or ninth); some versions say every year.

When the time for the third sacrifice approached, the Athenian prince Theseus volunteered to slay the monster. He promised his father Aegeus that he would change the somber black sail of the boat carrying the victims from Athens to Crete, and put up a white sail for his return journey if he was successful; the crew would leave up the black sail if he was killed.

In Crete, Minos's daughter Ariadne fell madly in love with Theseus and helped him navigate the Labyrinth. In most accounts she gave him a ball of thread, allowing him to retrace his path. According to various classical sources and representations, Theseus killed the Minotaur with his bare hands, sometimes with a club or a sword. He then led the Athenians out of the Labyrinth, and they sailed with Ariadne away from Crete. On the way home, Theseus abandoned Ariadne on the island of Naxos and continued to Athens. The returning group neglected to replace the black sail with the promised white sail, and from his lookout on Cape Sounion, King Aegeus saw the black-sailed ship approach. Presuming his son dead, he killed himself by leaping into the sea that is since named after him. His death secured the throne for Theseus.

Interpretations

The contest between Theseus and the Minotaur was frequently represented in Greek art. A Knossian didrachm exhibits on one side the Labyrinth, on the other the Minotaur surrounded by a semicircle of small balls, probably intended for stars; one of the monster's names was Asterion or Asterius ("star"). Pasiphaë gave birth to Asterius, who was called the Minotaur. He had the face of a bull, but the rest of him was human; and Minos, in compliance with certain oracles, shut him up and guarded him in the Labyrinth.While the ruins of Minos' palace at Knossos were discovered, the Labyrinth never was. The multiplicity of rooms, staircases and corridors in the palace has led some archaeologists to suggest that the palace itself was the source of the Labyrinth myth, with over 1300 maze-like compartments, an idea that is now generally discredited.
Homer, describing the shield of Achilles, remarked that Daedalus had constructed a ceremonial dancing ground for Ariadne, but does not associate this with the term labyrinth.

Some 19th century mythologists proposed that the Minotaur was a personification of the sun and a Minoan adaptation of the Baal-Moloch of the Phoenicians. The slaying of the Minotaur by Theseus in that case could be interpreted as a memory of Athens breaking tributary relations with Minoan Crete.

According to A.B. Cook, Minos and Minotaur were different forms of the same personage, representing the sun-god of the Cretans, who depicted the sun as a bull. He and J. G. Frazer both explain Pasiphaë's union with the bull as a sacred ceremony, at which the queen of Knossos was wedded to a bull-formed god, just as the wife of the Tyrant in Athens was wedded to Dionysus. E. Pottier, who does not dispute the historical personality of Minos, in view of the story of Phalaris, considers it probable that in Crete (where a bull cult may have existed by the side of that of the labrys) victims were tortured by being shut up in the belly of a red-hot brazen bull. The story of Talos, the Cretan man of brass, who heated himself red-hot and clasped strangers in his embrace as soon as they landed on the island, is probably of similar origin.

Karl Kerenyi viewed the Minotaur, or Asterios, as a god associated with stars, comparable to Dionysus. Coins minted at Cnossus from the fifth century showed labyrinth patterns encircling a goddess' head crowned with a wreath of grain, a bull's head, or a star. Kerenyi argued that the star in the Labyrinth was in fact Asterios, making the Minotaur a "luminous" deity in Crete, associated with a goddess known as the Mistress of the Labyrinth.   

A historical explanation of the myth refers to the time when Crete was the main political and cultural potency in the Aegean Sea. As the fledgling Athens (and probably other continental Greek cities) was under tribute to Crete, it can be assumed that such tribute included young men and women for sacrifice. This ceremony was performed by a priest disguised with a bull head or mask, thus explaining the imagery of the Minotaur.

Once continental Greece was free from Crete's dominance, the myth of the Minotaur worked to distance the forming religious consciousness of the Hellene poleis from Minoan beliefs. 

A geological interpretation also exists. Citing early descriptions of the minotaur by Callimachus as being entirely focused on the "cruel bellowing"
it made from its underground labyrinth, and the extensive tectonic activity in the region, science journalist Matt Kaplan has theorised that the myth may well stem from geology.

Image gallery

Cultural references

Dante's Inferno

The Minotaur (infamia di Creti, Italian for "infamy of Crete"), appears briefly in Dante's Inferno, in Canto 12 (l. 12–13, 16–21), where Dante and his guide Virgil find themselves picking their way among boulders dislodged on the slope and preparing to enter into the seventh circle of hell. Dante and Virgil encounter the beast first among the "men of blood": those damned for their violent natures. Some commentators believe that Dante, in a reversal of classical tradition, bestowed the beast with a man's head upon a bull's body, though this representation had already appeared in the Middle Ages.

Inferno, Canto XII, lines 16–20

Lo savio mio inver' lui gridò: "Forse
tu credi che qui sia 'l duca d'Atene,
che sú nel mondo la morte ti porse?
Pártiti, bestia, ché questi non-vene
ammaestrato da la tua sorella,
ma vassi per veder la vostre pene."

English translation

My sage cried out to him: "You think,
perhaps, this is the Duke of Athens,
who in the world put you to death.
Get away, you beast, for this man
does not come tutored by your sister;
he comes to view your punishments."

In these lines, Virgil taunts the Minotaur to distract him, and reminds the Minotaur that he was killed by Theseus the Duke of Athens with the help of the monster's half-sister Ariadne. The Minotaur is the first infernal guardian whom Virgil and Dante encounter within the walls of Dis.
The Minotaur seems to represent the entire zone of Violence, much as Geryon represents Fraud in Canto XVI, and serves a similar role as gatekeeper for the entire seventh Circle.

Giovanni Boccaccio writes of the Minotaur in his literary commentary of the Commedia: "When he had grown up and become a most ferocious animal, and of incredible strength, they tell that Minos had him shut up in a prison called the labyrinth, and that he had sent to him there all those whom he wanted to die a cruel death". Dante Gabriel Rossetti, in his own commentary, compares the Minotaur with all three sins of violence within the seventh circle: "The Minotaur, who is situated at the rim of the tripartite circle, fed, according to the poem was biting himself (violence against oneself) and was conceived in the 'false cow' (violence against nature, daughter of God)."

Virgil and Dante then pass quickly by to the centaurs (Nessus, Chiron and Pholus) who guard the Flegetonte ("river of blood"), to continue through the seventh Circle.

Surrealist art 

 From 1933 to 1939, Albert Skira published an avant-garde literary magazine Minotaure, with covers featuring a Minotaur theme. The first issue had cover art by Pablo Picasso. Later covers included work by Salvador Dalí, René Magritte, Max Ernst, and Diego Rivera. 
 Pablo Picasso made a series of etchings in the Vollard Suite showing the Minotaur being tormented, possibly inspired also by Spanish bullfighting. He also depicted a Minotaur in his 1933 etching Minotaur Kneeling over Sleeping Girl and in his 1935 etching Minotauromachy.

Television, literature and plays
 Argentine author Julio Cortázar published the play Los reyes in 1949, which reinterprets the Minotaur's story. In the book, Ariadne is not in love with Theseus, but with her brother the Minotaur.
 Mika Waltari's 1945 historical novel The Egyptian, set in the 12th century B.C., sees the main protagonist and his slave venture into the Cretan labyrinth in search of the protagonist's love interest, sacrificed to a Cretan god beforehand. Minotaur, in turn, is the name of the chief Cretan priest who wears a bull mask, which makes people confuse him for an actual human/bull hybrid upon first encounter in a dim light.
The short story The House of Asterion by the Argentine writer Jorge Luis Borges gives the Minotaur's story from the monster's perspective.
 Mark Z. Danielewski's novel House of Leaves features both the labyrinth and the Minotaur as prominent themes.
 Aleksey Ryabinin's book Theseus (2018). provides a retelling of the myths of Theseus, Minotaur, Ariadne and other personages of Greek mythology.
 The Minotaur, an opera by Harrison Birtwistle.
 Minotauria is a genus of Balkan woodlouse hunting spiders named in its honor.
 The Minotaur, a play by Anna Ziegler, is a modern take on the Greek myth first performed in 2012 at Synchronicity Theatre in Atlanta, GA.

Board and video games
 The popular role-playing game Dungeons & Dragons features Minotaurs.
 Madness and the Minotaur is a 1981 text adventure game for the TRS-80 Color Computer
 The storyline of the 2017 virtual reality video game Theseus revolves around the titular hero's mission to defeat the Minotaur.
 In Assassin's Creed: Odyssey (2018), there is a mission where the main character (Alexios or Kassandra) visits the ruins of the Palace of Knossos to kill the Minotaur in the Labyrinth of the Lost Souls. Completing the mission grants the player the achievement "A-maze-ing Victory" on the Steam and Xbox platforms and a PlayStation trophy of the same name.
In the video game Hades (2020) by Supergiant Games, the protagonist defeats the Minotaur (named Asterius) in Elysium, where he fights beside Theseus.
In the turn-based strategy series Heroes of Might & Magic, the Minotaur is a unit that is controllable by the player. Traditionally, they are sided with the Dungeon faction (Formerly the Warlock / Mountain faction).
In the mobile game Fate/Grand Order, the Minotaur is named Asterios, and summonable as a Berserker-class Servant; this particular version of the character is shown with a child-like mentality and loves Euryale, one of the Gorgons.
In the Total War Saga: Troy, in the campaign, the player can come across mythical units to recruit in their armies, one of which is the Minotaur. One of his recruiting locations can be found on the Crete. Minotaur is also available to play in the custom games.
The Castlevania series features minotaurs as enemies starting in Castlevania: Rondo of Blood.
In the 2002 Ensemble Studios real-time strategy game Age of Mythology, minotaurs can be trained and used in combat by Greek players who choose to worship Athena.
 In King's Quest VI: Heir Today, Gone Tomorrow the protagonist has to defeat the Minotaur to escape the labyrinth
 Teros, one of the playable legends in Brawlhalla, is a gladiator-driven adaptation of the minotaur.
 The Minotaur appears as an enemy in Miitopia, with three main alts. The first is the regular Minotaur, which is fought as a boss in the second kingdom, Neksdor. The second alt is the Blue Minotaur, which is mainly fought in the Dark Lord's Castle in Karkaton. Then, in the post-game area New Lumos, the First District boss is a Minotaur called King Cow, who is also fought in the Ground Floor of the dungeon in New Lumos, the Tower of Dread. all of them have the same moves, either using a AOE earthquake attack, or smacking a party member with their giant mallet.
 League of Legends (2009) features a playable character named "Alistar", who is modeled after a Minotaur.

Film
Minotaur, the Wild Beast of Crete, a 1960 Italian film directed by Silvio Amadio and starring Bob Mathias
Sinbad and the Eye of the Tiger, a 1976 film directed by Sam Wanamaker with Peter Mayhew, in his film debut, as Minoton, a bronze Minotaur golem
A monster resembling the Minotaur (and named as such) appears in the 1981 film Time Bandits.
Minotaur, a horror adaptation of the legend starring actor Tom Hardy as Theo (Theseus), released on DVD by Lions Gate in 2006
Natalie Portman and Danny McBride team up to fight a minotaur while reclaiming a magical sword from a labyrinth in Your Highness, released in 2008 by Universal Pictures.
In Dave Made a Maze, An Origami Minotaur appears as the creature that lives in the eponymous maze.
Caroline Polachek's music video for Bunny Is a Rider features the singer teleporting away from a shadow of the Minotaur through various parts of a maze of boxes

See also
Kao (bull) – a legendary chaotic bull in Meitei mythology, similar to Minotaur in character. 
Ox-Head and Horse-Face – two guardians or types of guardians of the underworld in Chinese mythology.
Satyr – a legendary human-horse (later human-goat) hybrid(s)
Shedu – a figure in Mesopotamian mythology with the body of a bull and a human head
Tikbalang – a creature of Philippine folklore with the head and hooves of a horse, usually depicted standing on its hind legs.

Footnotes

References

External links 

Minotaur in Greek Myth source Greek texts and art.

 
Anthropomorphic animals
Cattle in art
Labours of Theseus
Monsters in Greek mythology
Mythological bovines
Mythological human hybrids
Cretan characters in Greek mythology
Knossos